Girolamo Odam (1681- after 1718) was an Italian painter of the Baroque period.

Born in Rome to a family from Lorena, he trained under Carlo Maratta. He was recognized as a pastel portraitist and landscape artist, as well as wood engraver.

References

1681 births
17th-century Italian painters
Italian male painters
18th-century Italian painters
Italian Baroque painters
Year of death unknown
Pupils of Carlo Maratta
18th-century Italian male artists